Shealeigh Noelle Voitl (born March 29, 1998), known simply as Shealeigh, is an American singer-songwriter. She is best known for winning the fourth season of Radio Disney's N.B.T. (Next Big Thing) competition. In 2017, Shealeigh released her debut EP, We All Need to Go Places. In 2022 she returned with her sophomore EP: The Whole Sun Balancing Upon My Knees. She has written all her songs herself.

Personal life 
Shealeigh was born in Winfield, Illinois. She went to Hawk Hallow Elementary School, Eastview Middle School, Bartlett High School, and North Central College.

Music career 
In 2009, at the age of 11, Shealeigh won the fifth season of the YouTube singing competition Cree Ingles Idol Search (now called Cree Ingles YouTube Idol). Ellen DeGeneres spotted one of Shealeigh's videos on YouTube in 2010 and invited her to perform on The Ellen DeGeneres Show.

One year later, Shealeigh competed in the fourth season of Radio Disney's N.B.T. (Next Big Thing). On December 7, 2011, she won the competition with the song "What Can I Say". She released her first non-Disney single, "Strangely Beautiful", in 2012. 

In 2017, Shealeigh released her debut EP, We All Need to Go Places, which was followed by a single called "Landline" in 2018.

Shealeigh released her next EP, The Whole Sun Balancing Upon My Knees, in 2022.

Discography

Extended plays

Singles

References 

1998 births
Living people
American child singers
American women pop singers
American women singer-songwriters
Child pop musicians
Singing talent show winners
Singers from Chicago
People from Winfield, Illinois
Participants in American reality television series
21st-century American women singers
21st-century American singers
Singer-songwriters from Illinois